Schranz is a German surname. Notable people with the surname include:

Andreas Schranz (born 1979), Austrian football goalkeeper
Ivan Schranz (born 1993), Slovak football player
Karl Schranz (born 1938), Austrian alpine skier 
Károly Schranz (born 1952), Hungarian violinist 
Wolfgang Schranz (born 1976), Austrian tennis player

See also
 Schranz, a musical genre (see: Hardtechno)

German-language surnames